The Japanese Horse of the Year is the highest honor given in Japanese thoroughbred horse racing. It is awarded annually by the Japan Racing Association (JRA).
Since 1987 the honor has been part of the JRA Awards. This award originally started as part of the Keishū Sha Awards in 1954 and since 1972 part of the Yūshun Awards.

Records
Most successful horse (2 wins):
 Shinzan – 1963, 1964
 Speed Symboli – 1967, 1970
 Hoyo Boy – 1980, 1981
 Symboli Rudolf – 1984, 1985
 Symboli Kris S – 2002, 2003
 Deep Impact - 2005, 2006
 Vodka – 2008, 2009
 Gentildonna – 2012, 2014
 Kitasan Black – 2016, 2017
 Almond Eye – 2018, 2020

Honorees

References

Horse racing awards